The BMW IV was a six-cylinder, water-cooled inline aircraft engine built in Germany in the 1920s. Power was in the 180 kW (250 hp) range.

World record 
Diemer stated at the time, "I could have gone much higher, but I didn't have enough oxygen."

Applications
 Arado SC I
 Albatros L 72
 Albatros L 74
 Caspar C 27
 DFW F37
 Heinkel HD 22
 Heinkel HD 24
 Heinkel HD 39
 Junkers A 35
 Junkers F 13
 LFG V 59
 LFG V 60
 Polikarpov R-1 BMW (Soviet unlicensed copy of Airco DH.9A)
 Rohrbach Ro VII Robbe
 Rohrbach Ro VIII Roland I
 Type 91 Heavy Tank
 Type 95 Heavy Tank

Specifications

See also

References

External links 

BMW aircraft engines
1910s aircraft piston engines
Straight-six engines